The 1900 Iowa Hawkeyes football team represented the University of Iowa in the 1900 Western Conference football season. This was the first season the Hawkeyes played in the Western Conference.

Schedule

References

Iowa
Iowa Hawkeyes football seasons
Big Ten Conference football champion seasons
Iowa Football